Water polo has been played consistently at the Mediterranean Games since the year 1951. The Italy men's national water polo team is the most successful team among men, while for women it is the Spain women's national water polo team that gain success with the first inaugural Edition in 2018 Mediterranean Games.

Men's tournament

Medals Summary, Men

Women's tournament

Medals Summary, Women

Footnotes

 
Sports at the Mediterranean Games
Mediterranean Games
Mediterranean Games